New Zealand political leader John Key assembled a "shadow cabinet" within the National Party caucus after his election to the position of Leader of the Opposition in 2006. He composed this of individuals who acted for the party as spokespeople in assigned roles while he was Leader of the Opposition (2006–2008).

As the National Party formed the largest party not in government at the time, the frontbench team was as a result the Official Opposition within the New Zealand House of Representatives.

Frontbench team
The list below contains a list of Key's spokespeople and their respective roles as announced December 2006. The first thirty members are given rankings with an extended group of junior members who are unranked.

Further reading

References 

New Zealand National Party
Key, John
2006 establishments in New Zealand
2008 disestablishments in New Zealand